Daniel James Burawa (born December 30, 1988) is an American former Major League Baseball (MLB) pitcher who played for the New York Yankees and Atlanta Braves in 2015, and also played internationally for the Israel national baseball team.

Early life
Burawa was born in Riverhead, New York, to Paul and Denise Burawa.

Amateur career
Burawa attended Rocky Point High School in Rocky Point, New York, on the North Shore of Long Island, where he pitched for the Eagles. During his junior year, he threw two no-hitters. He was two-time All-League, and as a senior was All-County and All-Long Island.

Burawa first attended Suffolk Community College. After his freshman year, he transferred to St. John's University in 2009. After redshirting his sophomore year, Burawa played for the St. John's Red Storm baseball team in the Big East Conference. In his one year at St. John's, Burawa as the team's closer had a 1.02 ERA with 1 win and 8 saves, as in 18 innings he had 27 strikeouts and 8 walks. In 2009, he played collegiate summer baseball for the Madison Mallards in the Northwoods League, and in 2010, he played collegiate summer baseball with the Harwich Mariners of the Cape Cod Baseball League.

Professional career

New York Yankees
The New York Yankees selected Burawa in the 12th round of the 2010 Major League Baseball Draft, and signed him for a signing bonus of $300,000. That year he pitched seven innings in relief for the Staten Island Yankees of the Class A- New York-Pennsylvania League.

In 2011, he pitched for the Charleston RiverDogs in the Class A South Atlantic League, going 3–2 with 3 saves and a 3.63 ERA. He then pitched for the Tampa Yankees of the Class A+ Florida State League, going 2–2 with 2 saves and a 3.66 ERA.

During spring training in 2012, Burawa suffered a tear to his oblique muscle and a cracked rib, which cost him the entire season. At the time his fastball was 93–95 mph, and he also threw a slurve (combination curveball and slider) at 75–78 mph.

In 2013, he pitched for the Trenton Thunder of the Class AA Eastern League. He pitched to a 6–3 win–loss record with 4 saves and a 2.59 earned run average (ERA) and 66 strikeouts in 66 innings pitched over 46 relief appearances. He was throwing a 95–98 mph fastball, and a mid 80s  slider.

The Yankees invited Burawa to spring training in 2014. He pitched for the Trenton Thunder, going 0–0 with 1 save and a 1.59 ERA and 18 strikeouts in 17 innings in 11 relief appearances. He also pitched for the Scranton/Wilkes-Barre RailRiders of the Class AAA International League, going 3–1 with 3 saves and a 5.95 ERA and 55 strikeouts in 42.1 innings in 31 relief appearances.

After the 2014 season, the Yankees added Burawa to their 40-man roster. Burawa began the 2015 season with Scranton/Wilkes-Barre. After pitching to a 1.75 ERA in 26 appearances, the Yankees promoted him to the major leagues on June 21. Burawa was designated for assignment on August 5. For the season, with Scranton/Wilkes-Barre he was 1–3 with 1 save and a 2.55 ERA in 32 games, and in 3 starts with Trenton he had a 3.27 ERA.

Atlanta Braves
On August 14, 2015, the Atlanta Braves claimed Burawa off of waivers, They assigned him to the Gwinnett Braves of the International League, where in 4 relief appearances he had a 2.08 ERA. He was called up by the Braves on September 1, when rosters expanded. He appeared in 12 games in relief for Atlanta, and had a 3.65 ERA.

In 2016, he pitched for the Mississippi Braves of the AA Southern League, and was 2–0 with a 6.75 ERA in 9 relief appearances. Pitching for Gwinnett, he was 1–0 with 1 save and a 5.14 ERA in 7 relief appearances.  He was released on June 3, 2016.

Long Island Ducks
On July 15, 2016, Burawa signed with the Long Island Ducks of the Atlantic League of Professional Baseball, an independent baseball league. In 2016, he was 0–1 with a 5.09 ERA in 22 relief appearances.

Bridgeport Bluefish
On April 6, 2017, he signed with the Bridgeport Bluefish of the Atlantic League of Professional Baseball. In 2017, he was 2–2 with a 7.78 ERA in 22 relief appearances. He was released on June 26, 2017.

Team Israel; World Baseball Classic
Burawa pitched for Team Israel at the 2017 World Baseball Classic in March 2017.

References

External links

1988 births
Living people
People from Riverhead (town), New York
Sportspeople from Suffolk County, New York
Baseball players from New York (state)
Major League Baseball pitchers
New York Yankees players
Atlanta Braves players
St. John's Red Storm baseball players
Harwich Mariners players
Staten Island Yankees players
Tampa Yankees players
Trenton Thunder players
Scranton/Wilkes-Barre RailRiders players
Gwinnett Braves players
Long Island Ducks players
2017 World Baseball Classic players
Charleston RiverDogs players
Phoenix Desert Dogs players
Scottsdale Scorpions players
Mississippi Braves players
Bridgeport Bluefish players
Madison Mallards players